The City and the Dogs is a 1985 Peruvian drama film directed by Francisco José Lombardi. It is based on The Time of the Hero, a 1963 novel by Nobel Prize laureate Mario Vargas Llosa, which tells the story of a group of young military cadets at the Leoncio Prado Military Academy in Lima.

The film was selected as the Peruvian entry for the Best Foreign Language Film at the 58th Academy Awards, but was not accepted as a nominee.

Cast
 Alberto Isola as Mayor Garrido
 Gustavo Bueno as Lt. Gamboa (Teniente Gamboa)
 Luis Álvarez as The Coronel (El Coronel)
 Juan Manuel Ochoa as The Jaguar (El Jaguar)
 Eduardo Adrianzén as The Slave (El Esclavo)
 Liliana Navarro as Teresa
 Miguel Iza as Arrospide
 Pablo Serra as The Poet (El Poeta)
 Jorge Rodríguez Paz as The General (El General)

See also
 List of submissions to the 58th Academy Awards for Best Foreign Language Film
 List of Peruvian submissions for the Academy Award for Best Foreign Language Film

References

External links
 

1985 films
1985 drama films
Peruvian drama films
Films directed by Francisco José Lombardi
1980s Peruvian films
1980s Spanish-language films
Films based on Peruvian novels
Films about military personnel
Films about school violence
Films based on works by Mario Vargas Llosa